Vazhi Piranthadu is a 1964 Indian Tamil-language film written and directed by A. K. Velan. The film stars S. S. Rajendran, C. R. Vijayakumari and M. R. Radha.

Plot

Cast 
This list is adapted from the book Thiraikalanjiyam Part-2.

Male cast
S. S. Rajendran
M. R. Radha
Kuladeivam Rajagopal
P. D. Sambandam
Karikol Raju
B. S. Thadchanamurthi
Ramakrishnan
Archunan

Female cast
Vijayakumari
C. Lakshmi Rajyam
Lakshmiprabha
S. N. Lakshmi
Jayanthi
Seethalakshmi

Production 
The film was produced under the banner Arunachalam Pictures and was directed by A. K. Velan who also wrote the story, screenplay and dialogues.

Soundtrack 
Music was composed by K. V. Mahadevan while the lyrics were penned by A. K. Velan, A. Maruthakasi, Suratha and P. K. Muthusamy. A song written by Mahakavi Subramania Bharathiyar was used in the film. Playback singers are T. M. Soundararajan, A. L. Raghavan, P. Susheela, K. Rani, P. Leela and K. Jamuna Rani.

References

External links 

1964 drama films
1964 films
Films scored by K. V. Mahadevan
Indian drama films
1960s Tamil-language films